The 2020 Sun Belt Conference men's basketball tournament was the postseason men's basketball tournament for Sun Belt Conference during the 2019–20 NCAA Division I men's basketball season. Tournament first round, second round, and quarterfinal games were played at the campus sites of the higher seeded team between March 7–11. The semifinals and championship game would have been held from March 14–15, 2020, in New Orleans, Louisiana, at the Smoothie King Center. The regular season champion would have received the Sun Belt's automatic bid to the 2020 NCAA tournament.

Seeds
Only the top 10 of the 12 conference teams will qualify for the tournament. The No. 5 and No. 6 seeds will receive and first round bye, the No. 3 and No. 4 seeds receive a double bye to the quarterfinals, while the No. 1 and No. 2 seeded teams receive a triple bye to the semifinals. Teams are seeded by record within the conference, with a tiebreaker system to seed teams with identical conference records.

Schedule

Bracket

References

Tournament
Sun Belt Conference men's basketball tournament
Sun Belt Conference men's basketball tournament
Basketball competitions in New Orleans
College sports tournaments in Louisiana
Sun Belt Conference men's basketball tournament
Sun Belt Conference men's basketball tournament
20th century in New Orleans